The Catholic Church in Lithuania is currently entirely Latin and composed of
 two ecclesiastical provinces, with a total of five suffragan dioceses.
 the exempt military ordinariate.

Episcopal Conference of Lithuania

Exempt jurisdiction sui iuris 
 Military Ordinariate of Lithuania (Lietuvos kariuomenės ordinariatas)

Ecclesiastical Province of Kaunas 
 Metropolitan Archdiocese of Kaunas 
Diocese of Šiauliai
Diocese of Telšiai
Diocese of Vilkaviškis

Ecclesiastical Province of Vilnius 
 Metropolitan Archdiocese of Vilnius
Diocese of Kaišiadorys
Diocese of Panevėžys

Defunct jurisdictions 
There are no titular sees.

All Latin defunct jurisdictions have current successors, unlike the only Eastern Catholic diocesan see(s).

The Ukrainian Catholic Eparchy of Vilnius (Byzantine Rite, since 1809) was suppressed in 1828 and immediately replaced by the Ukrainian Catholic Eparchy of Žyrovyci, only to be suppressed again in 1833, without successor.

Sources and external links 
 GCatholic 
 http://www.catholic-hierarchy.org/country/dlt.html

Lithuania
Catholic dioceses